China at War: Triumph and Tragedy in the Emergence of the New China 1937-1952 is a 2017 non-fiction book by Hans van de Ven, published in the United Kingdom by Profile Books and in the United States in 2018 by Harvard University Press. It discusses the Second Sino-Japanese War and the Korean War. The American version of the title omits the years and is as China at War: Triumph and Tragedy in the Emergence of the New China.

Daqing Yang of George Washington University stated that the book "places China’s experience of warfare in world historical terms" in addition to "[emphasizing] warfare as a central theme".

Release

Reception
Victor Cheng of Australian National University stated that the book "In sum, [...] makes a significant contribution" to Anglophone scholarship on recent Chinese military history.

Diana Lary of the University of British Columbia described the book as an "outstanding study".

Yang stated that it is "is clearly the authoritative book" on the subject.

References

Notes

External links
 China at War - Profile Books
 Table of contents, maps, and introduction
 China at War - Harvard University Press
 China at War - Available from JSTOR

Books about China
2017 non-fiction books
Harvard University Press books
History books about the Second Sino-Japanese War
Works about the Korean War